Agrotera barcealis is a moth in the family Crambidae. It was described by Francis Walker in 1859. It is found in Sri Lanka, Sumatra, Borneo and Mysol.

The forewings are opalescent white with ochreous-brown speckles at the base. Both wings have a slender ochreous-brown outer discal line, bordered with pale yellow externally. This is followed by a brown speckled submarginal band.

References

Moths described in 1859
Spilomelinae
Moths of Asia